C.D. Necaxa was a Honduran football club based in Tegucigalpa, Honduras.

History
Necaxa were founded in 1954 by Wilfredo Guerra, the Mexican ambassador to Honduras at the time.

Promotion
On 23 May 2010 Necaxa obtained the promotion to the Honduran Liga Nacional for the first time in their history, after beating Atlético Independiente in Tegucigalpa 2–0.

They were dissolved in 2012 by selling their category to Platense.

Achievements
Liga de Ascenso
Winners (3): 2008–09 C, 2009–10 A, 2009–10 C

Stadium
The team played its home games during its stay in top-flight at Estadio Fausto Flores Lagos, which has a capacity for 5,000.

League performance
 Data since 2010–11

Top scorers

As April 2014

  Ruben Licona  (15) goals
  Nery Medina  (9) goals
  Harrison Rochez (8) goals
  Oscar Duron (6) goals
  Charles Cordoba (5) goals
  Ruben Matamoros (4) goals
  Luis Rodas (4) goals
  Jesus Navas (4) goals
  Shannon Welcome (4) goals

Former managers
  Denilson Costa (2011)
  Jorge Pineda (2011–2012)

References

External links
 Unofficial website

	

Defunct football clubs in Honduras
1954 establishments in Honduras
2012 disestablishments in Honduras
Association football clubs established in 1954
Association football clubs disestablished in 2012